Champepadan Creek is a stream in the U.S. state of Minnesota.

The name Champepadan comes from the Sioux language meaning "thorny wood river".

See also
List of rivers of Minnesota

References

Rivers of Murray County, Minnesota
Rivers of Nobles County, Minnesota
Rivers of Rock County, Minnesota
Rivers of Minnesota